Sarah Darcel (born 25 May 1999) is a Canadian swimmer. She competed in the women's 200 metre individual medley at the 2018 Commonwealth Games, winning the silver medal.

References

External links
 

1999 births
Living people
Place of birth missing (living people)
Swimmers at the 2018 Commonwealth Games
Commonwealth Games medallists in swimming
Commonwealth Games silver medallists for Canada
Canadian female medley swimmers
20th-century Canadian women
21st-century Canadian women
Medallists at the 2018 Commonwealth Games